Centrostephanus nitidus is a species of sea urchin of the family Diadematidae. Their armour is covered with spines. Centrostephanus nitidus was first scientifically described in 1927 by Koehler.

References 

Diadematidae
Animals described in 1927